The Hoher Randen  with its Schlattersteig is the highest mountain of the Randen, a range located between the Jura and the Swabian Jura. It is located south of Blumberg in the German state of Baden-Württemberg, near the border with the Swiss canton of Schaffhausen.

References

External links
Hoher Randen on Hikr

Mountains and hills of Baden-Württemberg
Mountains partially in Switzerland